Prann Records was a record label founded by musician Ike Turner in 1963. Turner used this label to release singles by artist he was producing outside of the Ike & Tina Turner Revue. Records on Prann were distributed by CIRCA distributing firm. CIRCA (Consolidated International Record Company of America) was formed in 1962 to operate as a releasing company for independent labels by working with various distributors around the US.

Artists 
Singer-songwriter George Jackson released his first single on Prann Jackson started writing songs while in his teens, and in 1963 introduced himself to Ike Turner at a concert. Turner took him to Cosimo Matassa's studios in New Orleans to record for Prann. Singer Fontella Bass recorded for Prann early in her career when she was a member of Oliver Sain's band. Turner also recorded for Prann under his alias Little Bones.

Discography

See also 

 Sonja Records
 Innis Records
 Teena Records
 Sony Records
 List of record labels

References 

American record labels
Rhythm and blues record labels
Pop record labels
Ike Turner
Ike & Tina Turner
Record labels established in 1963
Vanity record labels
Record labels based in California
Defunct record labels of the United States